Redlands United Football Club is an association football club based in Cleveland, Brisbane, Queensland. The club, formed in 1918, is one of the oldest soccer clubs in Queensland. It re-entered the top tier, Brisbane Premier League (BPL), in 2010 after merging with former Queensland State League (QSL) side Redland City Devils. In 2013 Redlands United gained a five-year licence for the new National Premier Leagues (NPL) competition which was renewed in 2018.

History

Redlands started the 2010 season relatively well, including a 7–0 thumping of Brisbane City at Spencer Park. However, due to a number of injuries the team struggled with consistency and found themselves in a relegation battle. The club, improved their form by end of the season and they finished well clear of danger in 8th place of the Brisbane Premier League.

Redlands were tipped by many to be one of the stronger sides in the 2011 Brisbane Premier League but once again were unable to fulfill their potential, eventually finishing in ninth place on 33 points. Although injuries played a part in their poor season, ultimately their inability to beat sides above them cost them dearly with the highlight probably being a 1–0 win away at Olympic FC.

In 2012, Redlands United finally fulfilled their potential, finishing top of the Brisbane Premier League by a point with two Wolves FC who won the competition in 2011. It was the first time the Devils had finished top of the table in a history that stretches back to 1918. Scottish midfielder Graham Fyfe scored twenty-nine goals for the season, which won him the Golden Boot award for top scorer in the league.

A frustrating first season in the National Premier Leagues Queensland in 2013 saw the Red Devils miss out on the play-offs by 3 points finishing 5th in the league.  Injuries to key players saw the depth of the squad tested, with many of the younger players given the opportunity to cement their place in the team.

Redlands qualified for the 2016 FFA Cup, their first ever FFA Cup appearance, after defeating Pine Rivers United Sports Club, Brisbane City FC and Rochedale Rovers FC in the 2016 FFA Cup preliminary rounds. In their first ever FFA Cup match, Redlands stunned defending A-League champions and 2014 FFA Cup winners Adelaide United 2–1, in front of a crowd of 1,564 at Perry Park. The victory was lauded as the biggest upset in FFA Cup history. Redlands were eliminated in the FFA Cup Round of 16, following a 2–0 loss to Canberra Olympic.

Redlands are one of relatively few state league teams to eliminate an A-League team in the FFA Cup, which they did in 2016.

Football Staff

Current squad

Honours

2016 - Queensland National Premier League Premiers
2012 - Brisbane Premier League Champions

References

External links
Redlands United Official Website

Association football clubs established in 1918
National Premier Leagues clubs
Queensland State League soccer teams
Brisbane Premier League teams
1918 establishments in Australia
Redland City